Waterloo Township is one of nine townships in Fayette County, Indiana. As of the 2010 census, its population was 607 and it contained 240 housing units.

History
Waterloo Township was organized in 1821.

The Thomas Ranck Round Barn was added to the National Register of Historic Places in 1983.

Geography

Unincorporated towns
 Springersville
 Waterloo

Adjacent townships
 Abington Township, Wayne County (northeast)
 Brownsville Township, Union County (east)
 Liberty Township, Union County (southeast)
 Jennings Township (south)
 Connersville Township (southwest)
 Harrison Township (west)
 Washington Township, Wayne County (northwest)

References
 United States Census Bureau cartographic boundary files
 U.S. Board on Geographic Names

External links

 Indiana Township Association
 United Township Association of Indiana

Townships in Fayette County, Indiana
Townships in Indiana
1821 establishments in Indiana
Populated places established in 1821